Adrien Mörk (born 19 September 1979) is a French professional golfer. In 2006 he recorded the first ever sub 60 round on any tour run by the PGA European Tour.

Career
Mörk was born in Montbéliard. He attended McNeese State University in the United States. He has been a professional since 2004 and, after finding success on the third tier Alps Tour, was a Challenge Tour rookie in 2006.

On 26 May 2006, in the second round of the Tikida Hotels Agadir Moroccan Classic, Mörk shot the first 59 in the history of the Challenge Tour, European Tour or European Seniors Tour. This was his scorecard:

He went on to win the tournament by one stroke. He also won the OKI Mahou Challenge de Espana later in the season as he finished 20th in the final Challenge Tour Rankings to graduate to the European Tour for 2007.

Mörk's rookie season on the European Tour in 2007 proved fruitless, and he found himself back on the lower level tours in the following seasons.

Professional wins (5)

Challenge Tour wins (2)

Alps Tour wins (3)

Team appearances
Amateur
European Amateur Team Championship (representing France): 2003

See also
2006 Challenge Tour graduates
Lowest rounds of golf

References

External links
 

French male golfers
European Tour golfers
McNeese State University alumni
Sportspeople from Montbéliard
1979 births
Living people